Claudia Hüttenmoser-Pfister (born ) is a Swiss wheelchair curler.

She participated in the 2010 and 2018 Winter Paralympics where Swiss team finished on seventh and sixth places respectively.

Teams

References

External links 

Profile at the Official Website for the 2010 Winter Paralympics in Vancouver
Claudia Hüttenmoser - Swiss Paralympic

 Video: 

Living people
1967 births
Swiss female curlers
Swiss wheelchair curlers
Paralympic wheelchair curlers of Switzerland
Wheelchair curlers at the 2010 Winter Paralympics
Wheelchair curlers at the 2018 Winter Paralympics
Swiss wheelchair curling champions